Emil Rizk is an Egyptian Olympic boxer. He represented his country in the lightweight division at the 1992 Summer Olympics. He lost his first bout against Ronald Chavez.

References

1970 births
Living people
Egyptian male boxers
Olympic boxers of Egypt
Boxers at the 1992 Summer Olympics
Lightweight boxers
20th-century Egyptian people